Elisha Lewis ( – January 7, 1867) was an American politician from Maryland. He served as a member of the Maryland House of Delegates, representing Harford County in 1862.

Career
Lewis served as a member of the Maryland House of Delegates, representing Harford County in 1862.

Lewis owned warehouses in Baltimore. Three of the warehouses burned down in April 1857.

Personal life
Lewis married. He lived at Bloomsbury estate, south of Havre de Grace.

Lewis died on January 7, 1867, at the age of 75.

References

Year of birth uncertain
1790s births
1867 deaths
People from Harford County, Maryland
Members of the Maryland House of Delegates